Moncayo may refer to:
Moncayo Massif, of the Sistema Ibérico
Monkayo, Compostela Valley, a municipality in the Philippines

People

Oswaldo Moncayo, a painter from Ecuador
José Pablo Moncayo, a Mexican composer
Pedro Moncayo, a canton in Ecuador
Paco Moncayo, former Mayor of Quito